Pico do Brejo do Cordeiro is a peak on the island of São Jorge in the Azores.

It is located around the area of Norte Pequeno and is intimidatedly related with a peak mountain in the centre of the island.  Its elevation is 739 m above sea level and is made up of a pluvial escarpment by the sea.  It geological formation are volcanic and pyroclastic in origin and are very old.

See also 
Topo Volcanic Complex 
Rosais Volcanic Complex 
Manadas Volcanic Complex

References 
Áreas Ambientais dos Açores, 

São Jorge Island
Geography of the Azores